Sybil Tawse (26 September 1886 – 6 February 1971), English artist and illustrator.

Life
Sybil Tawse was born on 26 September, 1886, the fifth child of George Tawse and Elizabeth Ann [Harrison] Tawse. The family lived in Bishopwearmouth (now part of Sunderland) in County Durham (now Tyne and Wear). She went to London to study at Lambeth School of Art and The Royal School of Art, where she was a King's Prize Scholar and a Silver and Bronze Medallist, exhibiting at the Royal Academy and at the Brighton Museum & Art Gallery. In London she lived on Gloucester Road, South Kensington, with her sisters Catherine and Gladys, a jeweler, then with Gladys in Cheyne Walk, Chelsea, building a steady career illustrating books, designing posters, and portrait painting. Tawse never married, dying in Portsmouth on 6 February, 1971 at the age of 84.

Work
Sybil Tawse contributed illustrations to a number of books, as follows:

 Our Own Story Book, Nister 1908, 2 colour plates
 Nister's Holiday Annual [1909] edited by Alfred C. Playne, Nister 1909, illustration
 The Essays of Elia by Charles Lamb, Chapman & Hall 1910, 24 colour plates
 Aunt Judith: The Story of a Loving Life by Grace Beaumont, Nelson 1910, 4 colour plates
 Dulcie's Love Story by Evelyn Everett Green, Nelson 1910, 4 colour plates
 Funny Folks, Nelson 1910, 4 colour plates
 Tales After Tea, Nelson 1912, colour frontis
 Stories for All Times, Nister 1913, endpaper illustrations
 The Fairchild Family by Mrs [Mary Martha] Sherwood, A & C Black 1913, 8 colour plates
 Cranford by Mrs. Gaskell, A & C Black 1914, 8 colour plates
 Tales from the Poets arranged by W.J. Glover, A & C Black 1915, 12 colour plates
 The Heroes or Greek Fairy Tales for my Children by Charles Kingsley, A & C Black 1915, 8 colour plates
 The Ideal Home by Matilda Lees-Dods, The Waverley Book Company 1916, 36 colour plates
 Stories of Gods and Heroes by Thomas Bulfinch, Thomas Crowell ca 1919, 8 colour plates
 The Count Of Monte Cristo by Alexandre Dumas, A & C Black 1920, 8 colour plates
 Mr. Midshipman Easy by Captain Fredrich Marryat, A & C Black 1921, 8 colour plates
 That Boarding School Girl by Dorita Fairlie Bruce, Oxford UP 1925, wrap-around colour cover	
 Miss Esperance and Mr Wycherly by L. Allen Harker, John Murray 1926, colour frontis and 44 illustrations
 Catriona by R.L. Stevenson, Nelson 1926, colour frontis
 Xmas shopping, Sybil Tawse poster for the London Underground 1927
 In The Swiss Mountains by Johanna Spyri, Thomas Crowell 1929, 8 colour plates
 Silas Marner by George Eliot, Nelson 1929, 8 illustrations
 John Halifax Gentleman by Mrs [Dinah] Craik, Oxford UP 1930, colour frontis and 4 illustrations
 Our Child's Red Letter Days by Marion Allbutt, Harrap 1931, 4 colour plates
 Mother Goose, Harrap 1932, dustwrapper illustration, 12 colour plates, and about 200 illustrations
 Anne of Green Gables by L.M. Montgomery, L.C. Page 1933, 8 colour plates
 The Goodieman's Whistle by Agnes Grozier Herbertson, Oxford UP 1935, 7 illustrations
 Pollyanna by Eleanor H. Porter, Harrap 1938, 8 colour plates
 Glen Robin by F.J.E. Bennett, Nelson 1941, colour frontis and 16 illustrations
 Read Me a Story compiled by Frank Waters, Harrap 1974, 7 illustrations from Mother Goose (1932)
 Playtime Reading with Mother compiled by Frank Waters, Harrap 1979, 10 illustrations from Mother Goose (1932)

Books undated by the publisher use the year of publication shown in the British Library catalogue.

References

1886 births
1971 deaths
20th-century English women artists
British women illustrators
People from Sunderland